Elliott David Fortune, (born May 28, 1974) is a former player in the National Football League (NFL). He played for the Baltimore Ravens. He played collegiality for the Georgia Tech football team.

Living people
1974 births
People from Roosevelt, New York
American football defensive ends
Georgia Tech Yellow Jackets football players
Baltimore Ravens players
New Jersey Red Dogs players
Milwaukee Mustangs (1994–2001) players
Carolina Cobras players
New York Dragons players